Hope Summers is a character appearing in American comic books published by Marvel Comics. Created by Mike Carey and Chris Bachalo, the character first appeared in X-Men #205 (Jan 2008, during the "X-Men: Messiah Complex" storyline). She is the first mutant born after the events of the "House of M" and "Decimation" storyline.

Publication history

"Messiah Complex" The Goddess of all Mutants 

Hope is the first mutant to be born after the Decimation, an event in which the Scarlet Witch uses her reality-altering superpower to turn all but 198 of the world's mutants into regular, depowered humans. The moment Hope is born, the mutant-locating computer Cerebro explodes, and soon afterwards the hunt for her begins.

Hope's town is attacked by the Purifiers, who use information given to them by the time-traveling Nimrod who warns them of her arrival. Although all the children in town are murdered by the Purifiers, the X-Man Cable manages to save Hope. According to Cable, the baby is a Messianic figure destined to save both mutant and humankind. The Purifiers and Bishop, however, recall a timeline in which Hope will become the mutant equivalent of the Antichrist, and kill a million humans in an instant. This event, known as the "Six Second War", will turn humanity against mutants once again and lead into a new era of mutant persecution, creating the dark timeline into which Bishop is born.

Later, the baby is kidnapped by the Marauders and delivered to the mutant Mystique who is disguised as Mister Sinister. Mystique takes the baby and makes her touch the comatose Rogue with the intention of waking her from her coma. The mutant Gambit intervenes and takes Hope from Mystique. Believing the baby has died during her rescue, Gambit is amazed to find not only is the baby unharmed, but also Rogue has been awakened from her coma. After an intense battle between the Marauders, the X-Men and Predator X, X-Men leader Cyclops decides the baby would be better off with his son Cable, and allows him to take her to the future. However, an adamant Bishop decides to track Cable and the baby through time in order to kill her and prevent the bleak future of his own timeline from happening.

Into the Future
During one of the first battles with Bishop, Cable's time traveling device is damaged, so he can only jump into the future, instead of the past, when he needs to escape Bishop each time he finds them. After several jumps into the future, it is revealed that Cable has taken her to the secluded safe haven of New Liberty in the future, where Cable marries a woman named Hope, who is like a mother to the mutant baby. Finding relative peace there, he raises her with Hope until she is seven years old. But then New Liberty is invaded by humanoid insects who called themselves the United States Army, later calling themselves humanoid Blattarians. Cable fights them and leaves New Liberty with his wife and her in order to make sure New Liberty does not fall.  After spending months in the wasteland, the family is attacked by the president of the insects, from whom Hope manages to save her family by stabbing the insect in his weak spot, since she has been watching Cable fight. Cable questions the president where he finds out that Bishop, in order to find Hope in the future, has destroyed all the continents in the world and left them uninhabitable, except North America, in order to box them in, find her and kill her. Cable kills the president, and the family moves on. The family encounters a settlement, but are met with resistance. Cable takes care of them easily, but not fast enough, as Hope is shot and dies in Cable's arms while the girl watches. The girl sees Cable bury the closest thing she ever had to a mother and departs with him. After arriving at a church, the pastor asks the name of the child. In that moment, Cable decides to name her Hope Summers, in honor of her adoptive mother.

"Messiah War"
In the Messiah War storyline, which ran through Cable and X-Force, Hope Summers was the center of conflict between the forces of Stryfe, Cable, and X-Force. The Messiah War was part of a three-part story that began with X-Men: Messiah Complex. During the Messiah War, Hope was kidnapped by Cable's clone Stryfe, in league with Bishop. Hope watched as Stryfe tortured Warpath until Cable, Wolverine and Elixir came to their rescue. In the following fight, Hope survived along with the rest of X-Force and Cable, though Bishop lost an eye to Wolverine and had his time travel device damaged. When Cable and Hope were forced to time travel again, Hope resisted because she wanted to stay with X-23 and Elixir, with whom she had bonded during the events of Messiah War.

She kicked Cable in mid-jump, stranding herself and Cable two years apart. They eventually reunited, with Hope now 11 years old instead of nine.

"Homecoming" and "X-Men: Second Coming"
In the four-part series A Girl Called Hope, Hope watches over Cable as he sleeps, and she says "I would come back from the dead to kill them", referring to anyone who would harm Cable, with the Phoenix emblem reflecting in Hope's eyes again as she looks in the fire. As the short series closes, it is revealed that Hope slaughtered many of the evolved wolves in order to keep Cable safe. A promotional image for the event was released depicting two versions of Hope: one angelic, emphasizing her role as a savior; the other as evil and surrounded by the Phoenix Force, depicting her as a destroyer.

During the "X-Men: Second Coming" story arc Hope manifests various X-Men powers such as Armor's psionic armor and Colossus's organic steel and kills Lang and Creed. Nightcrawler saves her from Bastion, dying in the process. With the assistance of the X-Men, she eradicates Bastion and shatters the dome surrounding the city. At a celebratory bonfire, Emma Frost notices the flames around Hope take the shape of the Phoenix, and triggers a flashback to the Sisterhood storyline where Jean freed her from Lady Mastermind's illusion after giving her the warning to prepare. Seized with terror, Emma runs to Cyclops to warn him but before she can, Cyclops tells her that Cerebro has found five new mutants that have appeared around the globe.

The Five Lights

After the events of Second Coming, five new mutants are detected by Cerebro. Hope is then tasked with the mission to find and help these "Five Lights". Hope finds the first of the Five Lights in Canada attempting to kill herself by jumping off a building. Hope touches the girl, Laurie Tromette, whose mutation is jump started (a power display similar to Sage's) and she develops an ability to fly. Introducing herself, she also agrees to follow Hope. Being in Canada, Hope expressed an interest in discovery her biological family to which Cyclops agreed and organized an escort team of Rogue, Dr. Nemesis and Cypher. Once the group arrived in Alaska they discovered the identity of Louise Spalding, visited her grave, as Louise was one of the casualties of the Purifiers when they killed everyone in the hospital, and Hope was able to meet her maternal grandmother, although she did not reveal her biological connection, she learned that Louise was considered a fiery redhead with a strong will, free spirit, and a good head on her shoulders. She worked as a firefighter in or near Cooperstown, Alaska, and didn't show any desire to "settle down" until she got impregnated with Hope.

Later she is called to Mexico by Cecilia Reyes and Psylocke where the second of the Five Lights lives. This new mutant is a boy called Gabriel Cohuelo, whose speed powers caused him to move so fast he had become invisible to the naked eye. Psylocke taps into Cecilia's powers to create a force field around his room so they would not lose him before Hope Summers could arrive to help. Hope manages to help him gather control of his abilities, however it is also revealed that his powers made him age slightly.

Accompanied by Storm, Hope finds the third of the Five Lights praying in a small church in Nigeria, surrounded by armed men who wish to kill her as they believe she is a "witch child", due to her newly manifesting power over fire and ice. Hope manages to help this new mutant, a girl named Idie Okonkwo calm herself and gather control of her abilities. As Storm and Hope proceed to leave with Idie the men attack, but Idie protects them from harm using her ability over fire and destroys the men's vehicles. She then opens her eyes to reveal her right pupil is blue (ice) and her left pupil is orange (fire).
 
Later Rogue, Hope, and the Lights arrive in Miami Beach to search for the fourth Light, a boy named Teon, in the hope of having him join the X-Men. Their first interaction with Teon results in the feral boy's attempt at "mating" with Hope. A battle ensues and is promptly finished by Hope who uses her power to tame Teon. From this point, Teon views her as his Master.

Generation Hope

In the series Generation Hope, Hope and the four "Lights" along with Rogue, Cyclops and Wolverine travel to Tokyo to find and help the fifth so-called "Light", a mutant boy called Kenji Uedo. Like the four new mutants to emerge since M-Day, Kenji's mutant powers manifested and caused some horrible side effects. He impales his agent with a tendril when the agent pressured him about his contribution for the "Future is a Four-Letter Word" event. He burst through the apartment building and onto the street where Cyclops and Wolverine are investigating. Kenji pulls down the Blackbird carrying Rogue, Hope and the rest of the Lights. Teon takes off after one of Kenji's tendrils and tears it apart. He releases a girl trapped inside but is utterly ineffective against him.

Hope attempts to make contact with Kenji in order to complete his transformation but he seemingly avoids her touch. She presses on after him and encounters him within his apartment. She tells him she's there to help and he explains how his "throat slid out of his neck and danced like an eel when this began" and NOW she's here to help. He turns around and grabs Hope and a large explosion follows. It turns out to be telepathic message. Then she falls from the sky and Gabriel saves her although she's unconscious. Kenji is blasted away by Idie and Cyclops and Wolverine try to kill him but Hope awakes and with the Lights tries to make contact with Kenji and she is successful. She passes out from strain.

Later, she and the five Lights travel to Utopia, where they all decide to stay to hone their powers. After Doctor Nemesis examines Hope and four of the Lights and determines the specifications of each of their powers, Hope and Gabriel share a kiss during a moment of privacy. Soon afterwards, after training the Lights to use guns, Magneto introduces Hope to his "old and dear friend", Charles Xavier. Hope takes issue with Charles calling his school a "School for Gifted Youngsters", thinking that it just increases the line between human and mutant. Instead, she suggests that a better future would dissolve the "us and them" mentality altogether.

While in one of Emma Frost's classes, Hope decides that what she is learning isn't useful to her, and she leads the Lights out of the classroom. Frost tries to stop them, but Hope just tells her to stay out of her mind and out of her way. Back at her quarters, Hope gets a letter from Hank McCoy, telling her that while most of the people on Utopia are good, they will still try and craft her in their image, and that her best course of action would be to leave. Spurred on by the letter, Hope goes and talks to Wolverine, but Logan simply tells her that she's not a fool, and he wants to keep Hope at arm's length for her safety. Hope then goes to see Cyclops, whom she tells that she will welcome his support, but he should stay out of her way; if any of that changes, Hope and the Lights leave Utopia. Cyclops accepts this agreement, telling Hope that he isn't a jailor and that she and the Lights are welcome to come and go however they like.

The Ward (#6–8)
A Sixth Light is located in Germany, and Hope and the Lights hurry to get there with their new liaison Shadowcat, where the German Authorities have cordoned off a hospital. Gabriel quickly tries to enter the hospital to scout the area, but he falls unconscious before he is able to enter it. Laurie is sent to retrieve Gabriel, but likewise falls unconscious. Teon rushes to retrieve them both, but seems somehow unaffected. Hope deduces that a telepath is at work, and that Teon is somehow immune to it. Kenji states that he also has somewhat of an immunity to telepathy, and hooks a cord from his body into Hope and each of the Lights to share his immunity. The group (sans Idie, who has stayed outside with Shadowcat) enters the hospital, and finds hundreds of people unconscious on the floor. They search the building, and find the Sixth Light, who is revealed to be a baby still in the womb of its mother. The baby is terrified to leave the womb, and rises all of the unconscious people into a zombie-like state to protect it. Additionally, it extends its influence to the area outside of the hospital, bringing Shadowcat and Idie, amongst others, under its control.

Laurie breaks off from Kenji's protection, and she is able to get Idie out of the area of influence by flying straight up. Laurie and Idie then rush back down to the building, and are able to hook back into Kenji's protection before they are taken control of. Kenji then plugs into the Sixth Light's mother so Hope can talk to the child telepathically. Hope and each of the Lights try to talk to the child, but all are rejected one after the next. However, Teon is able to talk to the child, using simplistic language to convince it to embrace life. The child is then born, and Hope's touch suppresses the child's X-Gene until its older. The celebration is cut short, however, as the group leaves the hospital; Shadowcat tells them that Teon's parents have sued for custody of their son.

On Utopia, Cyclops and Evangeline Whedon both believe that the case for Teon's custody is hopeless. Hope, however, remains confident that they will keep Teon because it's his choice to stay, and instead focuses on getting code names for the Lights. Gabriel chooses "Velocidad", which is Spanish for "speed", while Hope insists that "Hope" is already her code name. Kenji tosses around ideas such as "Derivative" and "Rei" (Japanese for "Zero", and a reference to Rei Ayanami from Neon Genesis Evangelion) before settling on simply "Zero". The group chooses "Primal" for Teon, and Laurie remains with "Transonic". Idie decides to no longer use the "Girl Who Wouldn't Burn", and decides to go by "Oya", in reference to Yoruba Goddess of Fire and Magic.

As the group gets ready to leave for court, Hope walks in on Zero working on a painting of her, which he quickly destroys because she saw it before it was ready. Several witnesses take the stand, including Primal's mother who gives a heartfelt testimony about wanting her son back. After she leaves the stand, Primal himself rushes the stand to give his own testimony, which is surprisingly well-spoken and deep. He explains that he is no longer sentient in the way that everyone else is, and that he sees the modern world through his primitive instincts. Give him a refrigerator and he will eat the food inside in order to satisfy his nutritional needs; give him a court room, and he will give the court a well thought out speech to get his needs. He requests that the court recognize his hyperinstinctive intelligence the same way it recognizes robotic and alien intelligence. He also hopes that his parents understand that he is happier now than he has ever been. Primal wins the right to stay with Hope on Utopia, but Zero wonders if he is actually happy, or if he is just lying to stay with Hope. He talks with Transonic about how Hope has changed them all, and they both agree that something isn't right about it. Zero reveals that "Judas" was another code name he was considering spitting back at their "messiah" Hope, and Transonic wonders if they can both be "Judas".

In the United Kingdom, a boy named Zeeshan is talking to his friends about how difficult it must truly be to be a mutant, especially if you get an "uncool" power. Almost immediately afterwards, Zeeshan's X-Gene activates, and Hope and the Lights begin to head towards Zeeshan, whose skin has started to melt off of his body. One of Zeeshan's friends takes pictures and videos of Zeeshan and posts them online, quickly getting thousands of hits. Greatly saddened, Zeeshan takes a steak knife into the bathroom to kill himself. All of the Lights feel this, and Transonic jumps out of the plane to get to Zeeshan quicker; it's too late however, as Zeeshan is already dead. Hope yells at Zeeshan's friends before returning to Utopia. Four weeks later, an enraged Zero is seen outside the building where Zeeshan's friend lives. He is about to kill him with a drone, but is stopped by Wolverine who tells him that "It gets better, kid."

After X-Man's return to Utopia, Hope had initially refused to even speak to him, due to X-Man's connection with her surrogate father Cable. However, when X-Man puts himself in harm's way in the Danger Room testing his newly restrained powers, Hope saves him and offers to teach him some non-power based combat techniques. X-Man agrees, and the two start training.

Fear Itself
In the Fear Itself crossover event, Hope is part of Cyclops' "Plan 2" in defeating Kuurth, the Breaker of Stone, who is leading his trail of destruction to San Francisco. Cyclops gathers all of the mutants of Utopia behind Hope, and gives her free rein to use any and all of their powers to remove Kuurth's telepathy-blocking helmet. Hope is successful in doing this, but is rendered unconscious from the stress of using all of the mutants' powers. Unfortunately, this plan is unsuccessful, as telepathy is revealed worthless against the Worthy. Kuurth simply continues his march of terror helmet-less, walking past the unconscious Hope.

Hope is later shown in Utopia's infirmary, along with Emma Frost, who had been telepathically injured by Kuurth when Hope removed his helmet. Emma is shown having a nightmare about the Phoenix, who feeds into Emma's fears that Cyclops will never love her as much as Jean. This Nightmare Phoenix manages to convince Emma that Hope is Jean reincarnated, and tells Emma that she knows what to do. Emma, in a trance like state, takes her pillow and heads towards Hope, about to smother her to death. However, she is stopped by Namor. They kiss afterwards.

X-Men: Schism
Hope watches news reports of Sentinels gathering after Quentin Quire's attack on the U.N. alongside Cyclops, Wolverine, Emma Frost, Magneto, and others. She is perturbed by the prospect of an oncoming attack and muses that such situations always end with dead mutants because people are always afraid of them. Later, after Oya and Transonic leave with several of the X-Men to attend the opening of a Mutant History Museum, Hope and Velocidad go on a date. The date appears to be cut short, however, as the new Hellfire Club attacks the Museum, and defeats most of the X-Men. Hope and Velocidad arrive at the Museum to discover that Oya has "saved the day" by "murdering" most of the Hellfire grunts based on Cyclops' orders to do what she thought was necessary. This causes Hope to chastise Transonic for losing her head during the battle and leaving Oya in that position, but Transonic explains that she is not a soldier except when Hope is around to influence her. Zero asks Oya if she is okay, but she horrifies Hope and the other Lights by asking if there is anyone else she needs to kill.

X-Men: Regenesis
Hope was not ok about the fact that both Logan and Scott want Oya to leave with Logan, but after a conversation with Transonic, she accepted it. Hope also asked Pixie not to leave, as her team needed a teleporter to avoid being too late to help other Lights, just like when they were too late to help Zeeshan. No-Girl is later also recruited by Zero. During a mission, the team finds the manifestation of a new Light, who is later revealed to be an amnesiac Sebastian Shaw. The front lobe of No-Girl is destroyed and Zero uses his powers to make her a body. Hope invites Shaw to also join the Lights. But when they return to Utopia, the team is attacked by the former members of the Morlocks. Hope is forced to control Zero's powers to stop them. After this, Zero loses confidence in Hope and rebels against her. Zero, using implants he had placed into the brains of some Utopia inhabitants, manipulates them into clamoring for Hope's death. No-Girl later kills Zero by disrupting his powers, also destroying the body he gave her. Her brain endures again, however, and Nemesis and Danger build her a new containment unit.

Avengers: X-Sanction
Before Cable can fire a round into Red Hulk's head, he hears a voice screaming "No". To his surprise it's Hope and Cyclops who were brought by Blaquesmith to stop him. Hope immediately hugs him and pleads to him to stop trying to take out the Avengers. Cyclops feels that Cable has lost control of his mind due to the techno-organic virus. Cyclops attempts to free The Avengers only to be held at gunpoint by his son, Cable, as he explains why it has to be done. Hope intervenes by saying she is grown and can make her own decisions. Cable states the mission has been compromised due to the fact that Hope wasn't supposed to be there in the first place.  She ultimately manages to permanently cure Cable of the T-O virus by completely burning it out of his system once and for all. Cable gives confirmation to Cyclops that Hope is indeed an aspect of The Phoenix.<ref>Avengers: X-Sanction #4</ref>

Avengers vs. X-Men

In AvX, Hope is targeted by the Phoenix Force. The Avengers want to take her into custody to protect her from the Phoenix Force, but the X-Men want her to be able to accept the Phoenix Force as it could help revive the dwindling mutant "race". As the two teams start fighting over this, Cyclops orders Emma to take Hope away so she could be safe. As the fight continues Wolverine and Spider-Man sneak into the building only to be confronted by a fiery Hope Summers, around her were the unconscious teammates from Generation Hope. As Wolverine moved to apparently kill Hope, he's overwhelmed by Hope who uses the power of Phoenix on him and escape the compound. While on the run, Hope creates a device that camouflages her power signature and makes her untraceable. After stealing a ship, she strikes a deal with Wolverine. Essentially, she wants the opportunity to contain the Phoenix Force, but if she is unable to do so then she will allow Wolverine to kill her. However, Hope is betrayed when Wolverine alerts the Avengers to her scheme. The team meets Hope and Wolverine on the Blue Area of the Moon. Before they can contain Hope, the X-Men also arrive. The Phoenix force arrives and, instead of possessing Hope, possess each of the five X-Men present. They take her now comatose body back to Earth and, as one, declare plans to heal her. However, she is subsequently rescued by the Avengers and the Scarlet Witch, who take her away to safety, with Iron Fist suggesting that she hide in the city of K'unn-Lunn.

Having learned about a previous Phoenix host who was also trained to become the Iron Fist of her era, Hope visits Yu-Ti, but Yu-Ti is unable to help her directly, instead instructing her to learn from Spider-Man based on a vision he had. Although uncertain what he can teach her, Spider-Man proceeds to tell Hope about his mantra of great power requiring great responsibility, giving her more to think about in her role as the host for the Phoenix. Spider-Man later teaches her about patience, and waiting for one's moment when it comes, and to step up to the challenge. Guided by these lessons, Hope fights alongside the Scarlet Witch against Cyclops when he takes on the full power of the Phoenix Force and ascends to Dark Phoenix as he kills Professor X, allowing her to not only take on the power of the Phoenix and restore the mutant race, but also have the power to give up that power afterwards. With her destiny fulfilled, she is shown departing Utopia to find a new place for herself.

Avengers vs. X-Men: Consequences
After the events of AvX, The Scarlet Witch and Captain America question Hope about what she wants to do with her life. Hope decides to attempt to live a normal life. She does not enroll at Jean Grey Academy, but enrolls in a regular public school. Around this time, Cable wakes up from his coma, and is cured of the techno-virus thanks to Hope, who has been searching for him, even sleeping in alleyways some nights. The Avengers even checked up on her. Cable disappears off-the-grid, but he secretly watches Hope in the shadows and even lets her know personally that it's not her job to watch him, but for him to watch over her.

Cable and X-Force
Hope has been living a 'normal life' for four weeks now. She speaks to a psychiatrist named Doctor Townley due to The Avengers making the sessions mandatory. She now has foster parents that watch twenty-seven hours of television a week, and their excessive smiling makes her uncomfortable. She feels that her foster parents can't compare to Cable. Domino is speaking to Boom Boom via communication link about how she made a sucker out of a client to pay her three times the amount for a job to rescue a professor from M.I.T. she considers "easy money". Turns out Hope had hacked into her files, and beat her to the punch. Domino is surprised to see Hope again. Hope makes a deal with Domino, the missing professor in exchange for Domino using her luck powers to find Cable. Domino and Hope locate Cable in a junkyard in Nebraska. Hope becomes enraged and mimics Cable's telekinesis. She explains that while she was looking all over the world for him, he was there and didn't bother to reach out to her the minute he woke up from his coma. Cable responds with "I miss you too kid. Every damned day". Hope's rage stops and she hugs him. Suddenly Cable has another headache and Hope sees visions of a future event, Cable passes out and awakens later on, only to see Hope's vision on television.

Wolverine and the X-Men
Hope makes a surprise visit to The Jean Grey Academy to see Idie on graduation day.

X-Force
In the new X-Force team, Hope is in a coma after being infected with a virus that infected both her and Cable. It was revealed that she was able to manifest herself in a digital avatar by copying the powers of a brain-dead mutant, MeMe. In order to remain with Cable's team, she had chosen to keep this a secret from him, adopting MeMe's identity, however her ruse is discovered by Psylocke, who chose to keep Hope's identity secret. Hope's secret ended up being revealed to all her teammates by Mojo, leading to an argument between her and Cable. After ForgetMeNot delivers a message from the real MeMe (whose residual consciousness possessed the drones in X-Force's headquarters) to Hope, she agreed to MeMe's life support being turned off, thus letting MeMe die and putting Hope back to being in a coma. Hope then convinces Fantomex, who now has god-like super-powers, to attack the X-Force and is able to copy his powers and remove the virus from herself and defeat Fantomex. She then takes charge of the X-Force and fires Cable, for leading the team down a morally questionable route.

Uncanny X-Men
With the majority of the X-Men believed to be dead following their battle against Legion and X-Man, Cyclops and Wolverine's ragtag team of X-Men created a hit list of lingering threats that need to be dealt with. Among the threats is the Mutant Liberation Front, who count former X-Men Hope Summers and Banshee among their ranks. Hope isn't dealing with Cable's death in Extermination very well, and has hooked up with the terrorist group Mutant Liberation Front. She has her sights set on assassinating Senate candidate Prestel, but the X-Men attempt to stop her. Hope believes she and Cyclops both failed Cable, who means a lot to both of them. She points her pistol at Cyclops, just as Wolverine's attacks via Magik's teleportation which surprises Hope, causing her gun to go off and the bullet to connect directly with Cyclops' right eye.

War of the Realms
Hope participated in Scott's survivor retrieval mission while the major and minor heroes of midgard did battle with the invading forces of Malekith. Making hit and run passes against enemy forces headed by Sabretooth working in league with the Dark Council while running the beachhead of fallen New York.

House of X
Hope would begin to realize her full potential while working with the newly reborn X in making a better society away from most human civilization: she now works in tandem with a core group of mutants known as The Five (Elixir, Proteus, Egg, and Tempus) in order to revitalize those whom were lost battling against the Orchis group. She would help them resurrect their fallen mutant brethren by enhancing their powers to a degree needed for stable physiological new genesis.

Powers and abilities
Hope Summers is an Omega level Mutant with an ability of unspecified limits to psychically manipulate and mimic the powers of other mutants.

This ability is primarily manifested as mimicry of the superhuman mutant abilities of those near her, however, she has demonstrated additional powers. When she was born, she unleashed a massive psionic pulse that destroyed Cerebro. She also proved to be immune to Rogue's newly lethal absorption power and her touch erased all of the previous memories and abilities Rogue had absorbed, including those of the Hecatomb. She also cured Rogue of the Strain 88 virus. During Messiah Complex when the Three-in-One tried to search for her when she was kidnapped by the Marauders, she was able to block and disrupt Cerebro from finding her.

Hope Summers can also mimic mutant powers at their utmost capacity. However, she generates power levels that are potentially dangerous to people and the environment around her. Prodigy describes her as a metaphorical "voodoo doll" of the mutant race. In the "Messiah War" storyline, after mentally scanning her, Stryfe hints that she has the same powers he does (telekinesis and telepathy), and is potentially far more powerful than he is. Her ability to mimic the powers of other mutants is restricted by the fact that they have to be "near enough" to her to mimic. When near Cable, Hope showed some telepathic and telekinetic powers at her command by stopping a bullet fired at her by Bishop. She then generated extremely powerful energy blasts that overloaded Bishop's own ability to absorb projected energy.

She can also jump-start a newly emerging mutant power though to an undefined extent, and can redirect the force of magnetic fields into negative matter. Hellion also theorizes that she is able to unconsciously enhance mutant abilities such as his own telekinetic powers to a level he could not reach before she was around him. She was also seen exhibiting several times the Phoenix Force. Later it was revealed that she is an aspect of the Phoenix Force itself which enabled her to operate independently from the Force itself and become the "White Phoenix of the Crown," albeit temporarily.

In House of X Hope's true abilities come to light, wherein she can modulate as well as control the abilities of other mutants. Having used her powers in conjunction with others in order to resurrect their fallen number.

Thanks to Cable's training, Hope has some knowledge of advanced technology. During the Avengers Vs X-Men storyline she was able to construct a portable device capable of masking her presence from Cerebra using components found at a common hardware store.

 Reception 

 Accolades 

 In 2014, Entertainment Weekly ranked Hope Summers 73rd in their "Let's rank every X-Man ever" list.
 In 2018, CBR.com ranked Hope Summers 5th in their "X-Men: The Strongest Members Of The Summers Family" list.
 In 2018, CBR.com ranked Hope Summers 1st in their "8 X-Men Kids Cooler Than Their Parents (And 7 Who Are Way Worse)" list.
 In 2019, Screen Rant ranked Hope Summers 3rd in their "X-Men: The 10 Most Powerful Members Of The Summers Family" list.
 In 2019, CBR.com ranked Hope Summers 7h in their "X-Men: All Of Marvel's Omega-Level Mutants, Ranked By Power" list.
 In 2021, Screen Rant ranked Hope Summers 2nd in their "10 Most Powerful Alternate Universe Members Of The X-Men" list.
 In 2022, Collider ranked Hope Summers 3rd in their "10 Most Powerful Marvel Mutants" list and 10th in their "20 Most Powerful Marvel Characters, Ranked" list.
 In 2022, The Mary Sue ranked Hope Summers 10th in their "10 Most Powerful X-Men of All Time" list.
 In 2022, CBR.com ranked Hope Summers 4th in their "Most Powerful Summers-Grey Kids From The X-Men Comics" list, 6th in their "10 X-Men Characters Fans Want In the MCU" list, and 13th in their "15 Strongest Omega-Level X-Men" list.

Other versions

Stryfe
In an alternate future, Hope Summers is killed by the Avengers. Her father, Cable, decides to travel back in time in order to save her. When the Phoenix Force comes back to take Hope Summers as a host, the Avengers and the X-Men battle each other. Hope Summers and Blaquesmith decide to work together to create a better world.

In other media
Film
Her character makes her film debut in Deadpool 2, portrayed by Islie Hirvonen. In the film, Cable travels back in time to undo the murder of his wife and daughter by the future Russell Collins aka Firefist. When Wade Wilson asks Cable about the burnt teddy bear carried around with, Cable tells Wade that it belonged to his daughter and that her name is Hope. In the end, Cable and Deadpool succeed stopping Russell, the burns on the teddy bear vanishing, indicating that his family is alive again in the future, although Cable decides to remain in the present to help the future turn out better than it did originally.

Video games
 Hope Summers is a playable character in Marvel Super Hero Squad Online.
 Hope Summers appears in several cards in the mobile card game Marvel: War of Heroes.
 Hope Summers is featured in the mobile card game X-Men: Battle of the Atom'' based on the comic book story with the same name.

Toys
Hope Summers was part of the Marvel Legends Terrax Build a Figure line released by Hasbro in 2012.
Hope Summers is one of the four Minimates included in the Avengers vs. X-Men boxset released in 2012.

Board games
Hope Summers is referenced in "Dark City", an expansion to "Legendary: A Marvel Deck Building Game". She is included in a game scheme called "Capture Baby Hope" where the players have to prevent the villains from successfully kidnapping her as a baby.

Collected editions

References

External links

Comics characters introduced in 2007
Marvel Comics characters who have mental powers
Marvel Comics mutants
Marvel Comics telepaths
Characters created by Mike Carey
Characters created by Chris Bachalo
X-Men
Marvel Comics female superheroes
Marvel Comics child superheroes
X-Men supporting characters